Paweł Woźniak (born March 5, 1969 in Zielona Góra, Lubuskie) is a former hurdler from Poland, who represented his native country at the 1992 Summer Olympics in Barcelona, Spain. He set his personal best (49.96) in the men's 400m hurdles event in 1992.

References
 sports-reference

1969 births
Living people
Polish male hurdlers
Athletes (track and field) at the 1992 Summer Olympics
Olympic athletes of Poland
People from Zielona Góra
Sportspeople from Lubusz Voivodeship
Skra Warszawa athletes
20th-century Polish people